The 2006 Tippeligaen was the 62nd completed season of top division football in Norway. The season began on April 9, 2006 and ended on November 5, 2006. Rosenborg became champions on October 29, with one round to go, by defeating Viking at home. The other main contenders for the title were Brann and Lillestrøm, the former securing their place as runners-up on the same day.

Rosenborg won their twentieth league title.

Notable events 

 Tromsø installed artificial turf at their home ground Alfheim stadion during the summer break.
 Tom Nordlie was sacked as coach of Start in July and was replaced by Stig Inge Bjørnebye.
 Ivar Morten Normark was sacked as coach of Tromsø in July, and was replaced by Steinar Nilsen in August.
 Rosenborg's coach Per-Mathias Høgmo took two months of sick leave from July 27. Assistant Knut Tørum served as caretaker manager.
 Kjetil Rekdal resigned as coach of Vålerenga on August 21, following the club's exit from the Norwegian Cup. Rekdal held the position for six years, leading his team to one cup triumph in 2002 and the league championship in 2005. The assistant coach Petter Myhre took over Rekdal's place.
 Tom Prahl was sacked as coach of Viking in September and was replaced by Tom Nordlie who earlier in the season was sacked as coach in Start.
 On October 31, Høgmo resigns as Rosenborg manager, effective immediately. Tørum, who led ROS from 10 points behind leaders Brann to win the title with one round to spare, is expected to be elevated to permanent manager.
 After the club's relegation, Ham-Kam's coach Frode Grodås, was sacked on November 7.
 Arild Stavrum was sacked as coach of Molde on November 8, after the club came dead last in the league.
 Uwe Rösler was sacked as coach of Lillestrøm on November 13.
 Tom Nordlie and Uwe Rösler traded jobs, Nordlie to Lillestrøm, and Rösler to Viking.

Teams and locations
Fourteen teams competed in the league – the top twelve teams from the previous season, and two teams promoted from 1. divisjon.

''Note: Table lists in alphabetical order.

1 Tromsø installed artificial turf on Alfheim Stadion in the summer break during the 2006 FIFA World Cup.

League table

Relegation play-offs 
 Odd Grenland defeated Bryne 10–1 on aggregate in a two-legged play-off:

Results

Season statistics

Top scorers

Discipline

Player
Most yellow cards: 8
 Jan Michaelsen (HamKam)
Most red cards: 1
28 players

Club
Most yellow cards: 49
Molde

Most red cards: 4
Tromsø

Attendances

Fair Play 

 The fair play table, using UEFA's Fair Play ranking system with scores from 1 to 10, was as such:
 Fredrikstad 8.02
 Rosenborg 7.97
 Vålerenga 7.88
 Lillestrøm 7.83
 Start 7.82
 Viking 7.81
 Sandefjord 7.77
 Stabæk 7.76
 Brann 7.72
 Molde 7.59
 Odd Grenland 7.57
 Tromsø 7.53
 Lyn 7.43
 Ham-Kam 7.23

See also 
 2006 1. divisjon

Notes and references

External links 
 Norwegian Football Association
 Fixtures, results and table for Tippeligaen 2006

Eliteserien seasons
1
Norway
Norway